Bauré is an endangered Arawakan language spoken by only 40 of the thousand Baure people of the Beni Department of northwest of Magdalena, Bolivia. Some Bible portions have been translated into Bauré. Most speakers have been shifting to Spanish.

Orthography

Vowels
 a - [a]
 e - [ɛ/e]
 i - [i/ɪ]
 o - [o/ɔ/u]

Consonants
 ch/č/z - [t͡ʃ[, [d͡ʒ] after n
 h/j - [h]
 k/c/qu/g - [k], [g] after n
 m - [m]
 n - [n]
 p/b - [p], [b] after m
 r/l - [r/l]
 s - [s]
 sh/š/x - [ʃ]
 t/d - [t], [d] after n
 v/b - [β/b]
 w/hu/u - [w]
 y - [j]
 '/h - [ʔ]

Grammar

Baure has an active–stative syntax.

See also
Llanos de Moxos (archaeology)

References

External links
 Lenguas de Bolivia (online edition)
 Documentation of Endangered Languages: Baure

Arawakan languages
Critically endangered languages
Indigenous languages of the Andes
Indigenous languages of the South American Northwest
Languages of Bolivia
Endangered indigenous languages of the Americas
Endangered Arawan languages
Mamoré–Guaporé linguistic area